The Ruera River is a river of the West Coast Region of New Zealand's South Island. It flows south from the Navigator Range in the Southern Alps, reaching the Copland River 30 kilometres east of Bruce Bay. The river's entire length is within Westland Tai Poutini National Park.

See also
List of rivers of New Zealand

References

Rivers of the West Coast, New Zealand
Westland District
Westland Tai Poutini National Park
Rivers of New Zealand